The Arlberg Tunnel may refer to:

the Arlberg Railway Tunnel of the Arlberg railway
the Arlberg Road Tunnel of the S16 Arlbergschnellstraße (S16 Arlberg Highway)